An automated vacuum waste collection system, also known as pneumatic refuse collection, or automated vacuum collection (AVAC), transports waste at high speed through underground pneumatic tubes to a collection station where it is compacted and sealed in containers. When the container is full, it is transported away and emptied. The system helps facilitate the separation and recycling of waste.

The process begins with the deposit of trash into intake hatches, called portholes, which may be specialized for waste, recycling, or compost. Portholes are located in public areas and on private property where the owner has opted in. The waste is then pulled through an underground pipeline by an air pressure difference created by large industrial fans, in response to porthole sensors that indicate when the trash needs to be emptied and help ensure that only one kind of waste material is traveling through the pipe at a time. The pipelines converge on a central processing facility that uses automated software to direct the waste to the proper container, from there to be trucked to its final location, such as a landfill or composting plant.

History
The first system was created in Sweden in the 1960s, designed by the Swedish corporation Envac AB (formerly known as Centralsug AB). The first installation was in 1961 at Sollefteå Hospital. The first vacuum system for household waste, was installed in the new residential district of Ör-Hallonbergen, Sweden in 1965.

Overview 
Pneumatic waste collection systems provide a number of environmental benefits. These systems can decrease emissions from transit of waste by up to 90%. Systems in Europe provide separate outlets for food, recycling, and non-recycling, making waste separation and recycling more efficient. Some systems require household ID cards to use, and limit the amount of non-recyclable waste allowed per month, issuing a tax if the threshold is crossed. In Bergen, Norway, this system resulted in a 29% increase in plastic recycling, and an 85% decrease in non-recyclable waste, plus a $2 million saving in waste collection costs.

These systems also decrease the risk of fire and prevent animals from accessing waste.

Issues with budgeting and logistics have prevented a more widespread adoption of these systems. Upfront costs can reach into the hundreds of millions, and it is difficult to build the system into existing infrastructure. Pneumatic waste collection is optimal for high density development areas rather than existing urban areas. Maintenance may be difficult, and damage or blockages from inappropriate use requires engineers to enter the pipes to fix them.

Current systems

The Envac proprietary system, Envac Pneumatic Waste Collection System, is used in more than 30 countries. Additionally, the Stream Automated Waste Collection System out of Malaysia has installed many systems in Asia.

There are close to a thousand systems in operation all over the world - in China, South East Asia, South Korea, the Middle East, the United States, and Europe. Notable examples in Europe were implemented in the Stockholm area in Sweden. and Leganés and Barakaldo in Spain. Another well known, yet rarely seen example is the one used in the utilidors in the Magic Kingdom theme park in Orlando, Florida.

In the U.S., this type of system is installed in several places but Disney World and Roosevelt Island are the best known. A pneumatic refuse collection system on Roosevelt Island, New York City, is said to be the largest in the United States and the only system in the U.S. serving a residential complex in this case nearly 10,000 people.

Major cities in which the system is operating include Copenhagen, Barcelona, London, and Stockholm.

Israel
In Israel there are currently 5 systems - 2 operational in Yavne and Ra'anana, and 3 planned in Bat Yam, Tel Aviv and Rishon LeZion. In a techo-economic analysis conducted by the Ministry of Environmental Protection, it was found that the cost of intra-urban treating in pneumatic collection in neighborhoods with multiple units and under funding contractors is 25% lower in comparison to conventional methods, and this is without internalizing the external benefits arising from it (value of time and pollution). It was also found that if the data referred to neighborhoods with higher buildings (with the same number of housing units), the cost of a pneumatic system was even cheaper (at least approximately 20%)

In 2006, Yavne municipality issued a tender for the establishment of a pneumatic evacuation of household waste for the residential project "Green Neighborhood" which comprises 4,700 household units in around 200 buildings. In September 2012, the system began operating in residential use. In February 2014, the municipality began replacing the neighborhood's street trash cans with pneumatic cans. Now there are also around 30 waste collection points in public areas - parks, schools and the streets. The system is also planned to be connected to all future neighborhoods and serve 10,660 house units.

In May 2012, Ra'anana municipality approved the residential project "Neve Zemer" which is planned to include around 3,550 housing units in around 235 buildings with a pneumatic evacuation system of household waste. As of 2018, the pneumatic evacuation system already became operational.

As of 2015, Bat Yam municipality is currently engaged in planning a tender for construction and operation of pneumatic evacuation system that includes 5,000 residential neighborhood units (approximately 60 high rise buildings) and 2000 hotel rooms. In 2017, the municipality published the tender for the planning, financing, construction, operation and maintenance of the pneumatic evacuation system.

In 2009, Tel Aviv municipality's head of the city's construction and infrastructure manager, Dr. Benny Maor, claimed that in new neighborhoods that are planned in the northwest of the city, there is an intention to install a pneumatic evacuation system. In 2013, the municipality requested the preparation of a plan for a pneumatic evacuation system as a condition for a building permit in part of a development plan of 11,446 square meters land plots located in Rothschild Boulevard and Ahad Ha'am streets.

Planned systems

Europe
A system is planned to be installed in the new Jätkäsaari residential neighbourhood in Helsinki, Finland. All housing cooperatives and other apartment buildings are obliged to join the network. The system envisioned for Jätkäsaari would help facilitate the separation and recycling of waste.

Each building will have a collection point with up to five wastebins or tubes, each for different types of waste and with the capacity to store several parcels of waste. The underground tube network would act in a manner similar to a packet switched telecommunication network, transporting one kind of waste at a time. Once an input bin is filled, or capacity is available, it is transferred to the central collection site combined with the same class of waste.

Similarly in Finland, a new suburban development, being built in the city of Tampere, will be home to 13,000 inhabitants, creating approximately 5,000 jobs along the way. The suburb of Vuores will have a total of 124 collection points and 368 waste inlets. The system's daily collection capacity for dry waste, bio waste, paper and recyclable cardboard comes to a combined total of 13 tonnes.

The MetroTaifun Automatic Waste Collection System was selected for Vuores since it consumes only a third of the energy compared to conventional pneumatic waste collection solutions, and half of the traditional garbage truck and container based collection method. When ready, the system will consist of about 400 waste inlets and 13 km of pipe work. The MetroTaifun automatic waste collection system started to collect waste in 2012.

In Bergen, Norway, a system covers most of the city center.

North America
A system is planned for a new City Center development in Carmel, Indiana.  It would service condominiums, businesses, and a hotel.

In March 2015, the city of Montreal abandoned its $3 million investment in a plan to install an automated vacuum collection system in the Quartier des Spectacles entertainment district.

Another installation is planned for Hudson Yards, Manhattan.

Middle East
The world's largest AWCS is now being built in the vicinity of Islam's holiest mosque in Mecca, Saudi Arabia. During the Ramadan and Hajj, 600 tonnes (or 4,500 cubic meters) of waste is generated each day, which puts a heavy demand on those responsible for collecting the waste and litter. In the MetroTaifun Automatic Waste Collection System, the waste is automatically collected from 74 waste feeding points spread out across the area and then transferred via a 20-kilometre pipe network to a central collection point, keeping all the waste collecting activities out of sight and below ground with the central collection point well away from the public areas.

See also
Pneumatic tube
Dustpan
Central vacuum cleaner
Transfer station
Waste collection vehicle
Waste collection
Waste collector

References

External links
 Article about the first automated vacuum collection system ever.
 History about the invention of automated vacuum collection system.

Waste collection
Networks
Transport systems
Pneumatics